Javier Eseverri Barace (born 28 August 1977), commonly known as Javi Eseverri, is a Spanish futsal player who plays for MRA Navarra as a Defender.

Honours
1 UEFA Championship (2007)
1 runner FIFA World Cup(2008)
1 División de Plata league (97/98)
1 División de Plata Cup (97/98)
1 best Ala-Cierre of LNFS (05/06)

References

External links
lnfs.es

1977 births
Living people
Sportspeople from Pamplona
Spanish men's futsal players
Xota FS players